Sherborne Museum is an independent local museum centrally situated in Sherborne, a small market town in north-west Dorset. Formerly a Saxon burgh, Sherborne evolved through the cloth, gloving and silk industries and is embedded in varied countryside united by scarps of Jurassic limestone.

History
Established in 1968, the museum developed from the town's historical society and set out to preserve local heritage for future generations. It occupies the former gatehouse and almonry of the monastery once associated with Sherborne Abbey in what is now a Grade II listed building. In 2007, a large upper room was rented from the neighbouring Somerset and Dorset Family History Centre to house its reserve collections.

Exhibits
The Museum aims to display the social, historical and industrial life of the town and its environs since Neolithic times, as well as its natural history. Highlights include fossils from the Inferior Oolite, a unique medieval wall-painting, an electronic touch-screen version of the 15th century Sherborne Missal, silk and gloving displays, a fine Edwardian era dolls' house and 200 watercolours of local flora by the pioneering botanical artist Diana Ruth Wilson (1886-1969). The photographs, postcards and paintings combined form one of the largest private collections of images of a town in this country.

References

External links

Local museums in Dorset
Sherborne